is a passenger railway station located in Takatsu-ku, Kawasaki, Kanagawa Prefecture, Japan, operated by the private railway company Tokyu Corporation.

Lines

Station layout
The station consists of two island platforms serving a total of four tracks, with the station building located above the platforms. However, since the station is built in a cutting in a hillside, the exits to the station are level with the ground-level road outside.

Platforms

Platform 4 is fenced off and is not used by stopping trains.

History
Kajigaya Station opened on April 1, 1966.

Passenger statistics
In fiscal 2019, the station was used by an average of 29,589 passengers daily. 

The passenger figures for previous years are as shown below.

Surrounding area
Takatsu Post Office
Japan National Route 246
Omachi Line Depot; depot for the rolling stock for the Oimachi Line

See also
 List of railway stations in Japan

References

External links

 

Railway stations in Kanagawa Prefecture
Railway stations in Japan opened in 1966
Railway stations in Kawasaki, Kanagawa